Laozhou Township (<!—see MOS:ZH-->) is a township in Yi'an District of Tongling, Anhui, China. The township is bordered to the east by Wusong Town and to the west by Wuwei County and Zongyang County.

History
Due to floods, all residents in the township and Xuba Township of Tongling along the Yangtze River were ordered to evacuate on July 11, 2020.

Administrative division
As of 2017, the township is divided into five villages: 
 Zhongxin
 Guanghui
 Heping
 Minzhu
 Chengde

Economy
The township is rich in rape and vegetables.

References

Towns in Anhui
Divisions of Yi'an District